Fitzhubert may refer to:

Clevont Fitzhubert, a 1981 album by American jazz musician Oliver Lake
Robert Fitzhubert, a 12th-century mercenary active in England